Dobyns-Bennett High School is a high school (grades 9–12) in Kingsport, Tennessee, United States. It typically educates around 2,400 students, although enrollment for the 2022-23 academic year exceeded 2,500 students.

As a part of Kingsport City Schools, students must be city residents paying city taxes to attend. Students that are not residents of the city may pay a tuition fee to attend. This tuition is collected to account for tax differences between county and city residents in order to help subsidize the cost of school programs and facilities. Dobyns-Bennett features a variety of programs for students of all academic levels. The many classes offered cater to many types of students who may want to attend technical schools or universities across the nation.

Radio station
Local radio station 90.3 FM WCSK is broadcast from Dobyns-Bennett.

Notable alumni

Lisa Alther – American author and novelist.
James Frazier Barker – Former President of Clemson University.
Darwin Bond – Track and field athlete
Skip Brown – Basketball Player, High School and College All-American, Wake Forest University (1973–77); selected in 1977 NBA Draft by the Boston Celtics.
Bob Cifers – Back, University of Tennessee (1946 Detroit Lions; 1947–48 Pittsburgh Steelers; 1949 Green Bay Packers)
Ed Cifers – End, University of Tennessee (1941–42, 1946 Washington Redskins; 1947–48 Chicago Bears)
Denver Crawford – Defensive Tackle, University of Tennessee (1942, 43, 46, 47), New York Yankees of the AAFC (1948)
Bobby Dodd – College Football Hall of Fame member as a player at the University of Tennessee and coach at Georgia Tech.
Mike Faulkerson Dulaney – FB, University of North Carolina at Chapel Hill (1995–1997 Chicago Bears; 1998 Carolina Panthers)
Blair Fowler – YouTube Personality who was on The Amazing Race 28
Daniel Kilgore – C, Appalachian State University (2011–16 San Francisco 49ers)
Blake Leeper – Paralympic silver medallist
Mike McKay, former weathercaster/announcer, WBT-WBTV, Charlotte, NC; now broadcast personality, WDAV-FM, Davidson, NC
Hal Miller – High School and College Football All-American Tackle, Georgia Tech, drafted by the San Francisco 49ers in 1953.
John Palmer – former NBC News correspondent.
Jimmy Quillen – Member of the United States House of Representatives representing Tennessee's 1st congressional district, 1963–1997
Mike Roberts – Professional baseball player (drafted in 1972 by the Kansas City Royals) and college baseball coach (1978-98 University of North Carolina at Chapel Hill).
Coty Sensabaugh – CB, Clemson University (2012-2015 Tennessee Titans, 2016 Los Angeles Rams, 2016 New York Giants, 2017-2019 Pittsburgh Steelers).
Gerald Sensabaugh – S, East Tennessee State University and the University of North Carolina at Chapel Hill (2005–08 Jacksonville Jaguars; 2009–12 Dallas Cowboys)
Selwa Carmen Showker "Lucky" Roosevelt – Class of 1946 was Chief of Protocol of the United States for almost seven years from 1982-1989—longer than anyone has ever served in that position
Calvin Sneed, Class of 1972, news anchor retired, WATE-TV Knoxville and WTVC Chattanooga, now historian, Sons and Daughters of Douglass Alumni Association, Kingsport.
Tyler Hayworth – OL, Wake Forest University 2012-2016 (2017 Jacksonville Jaguars)

See also
 List of high schools in Tennessee

References

External links
 

Public high schools in Tennessee
Schools in Sullivan County, Tennessee
Kingsport, Tennessee
1918 establishments in Tennessee
Educational institutions established in 1918